Carl Heinz Wolff (1884–1942) was a German screenwriter, producer and film director.

Selected filmography

Director
The Mexican (1918)
 The Prisoner (1920)
 Lord of the Night (1927)
 The Customs Judge (1929)
 Youthful Indiscretion (1929)
 Rag Ball (1930)
 Flachsmann the Educator (1930)
 Such a Greyhound (1931)
 Errant Husbands (1931)
 Mrs. Lehmann's Daughters (1932)
 The Country Schoolmaster (1933)
  (1934)

References

Bibliography
 Grange, William. Cultural Chronicle of the Weimar Republic. Scarecrow Press, 2008.

External links

1884 births
1942 deaths
People from Werdau
People from the Kingdom of Saxony
Film people from Saxony